Almazny (masculine), Almaznaya (feminine), or Almaznoye (neuter) is the name of several inhabited localities in Russia.

Modern localities
Almazny, Sakha Republic, an urban locality (an urban-type settlement) in Mirninsky District of the Sakha Republic
Almaznoye, a rural locality (a selo) in Sovetsky District of the Republic of Crimea

Abolished localities
Almazny, Rostov Oblast, a former urban-type settlement in Rostov Oblast; now a part of the town of Gukovo

Notes